Thomas Township may refer to:

Canada 

 Thomas Township, Cochrane District, Ontario

United States 

 Thomas Township, Ellsworth County, Kansas
 Thomas Township, Saginaw County, Michigan
 Thomas Township, Ripley County, Missouri
 Thomas Township, Johnston County, Oklahoma

See also 
 Thomas (disambiguation)

Township name disambiguation pages